Phrixotrichus is a genus of spiders in the family Theraphosidae. It was first described in 1889 by Simon. , it contains 4 species.

References

Theraphosidae
Theraphosidae genera
Spiders of South America